The New Brighton and Onondaga Valley Railroad, a horse-drawn street trolley line, was chartered on May 5, 1869, in Syracuse, New York. The road was also known as the New Brighton and Onondaga Railroad.

The company merged with Syracuse Consolidated Street Railway in 1890, after an agreement was made that allowed the new company to lease the lines.

References

Defunct railroads in Syracuse, New York
Defunct New York (state) railroads
Railway companies established in 1869
Railway companies disestablished in 1890
Interurban railways in New York (state)
1869 establishments in New York (state)